The Fayetteville Shale is a geologic formation of Mississippian age (354–323 million years ago) composed of tight shale within the Arkoma Basin of Arkansas and Oklahoma. It is named for the city of Fayetteville, Arkansas, and requires hydraulic fracturing to release the natural gas contained within.

Nomenclature

Named by Frederick Willard Simonds in 1891, Simonds recognized what is now the Fayetteville Shale as three separate formations overlying the now abandoned Wyman Sandstone: the Fayetteville Shale, the Batesville Sandstone, and the Marshall Shale. In 1904, the name "Fayetteville Shale" replaced all three of these names. The Fayetteville Shale that Simonds recognized is now considered as the lower Fayetteville Shale. Simonds' Batesville Sandstone was found to be the same as the Wyman Sandstone, and replaced the name "Wyman Sandstone", while Simonds' Batesville Sandstone became known as the "Wedington Sandstone Member" presumably after Wedington Mountain. The name Marshall Shale was abandoned and is now known as the upper Fayetteville Shale.

Natural gas 

The formation holds natural gas in a fine-grained rock matrix which requires hydraulic fracturing to release the gas. This process became cost-effective in some shales such as the Fayetteville after years of experimentation in the Barnett Shale in North Texas, especially when combined with horizontal drilling.

The Fayetteville Shale play began in July 2004 by Southwestern Energy Company in north-central Arkansas with the Thomas #1-9 vertical well in Conway County, Arkansas. In February 2005, Southwestern Energy drilled the first horizontal well, the Seeco-Vaughan #4-22H, also in Conway County.

The US Energy Information Administration estimated that the  shale play held 13,240 billion cubic ft (375 billion cubic meters) of unproved, technically recoverable gas. The average well was estimated to produce 1.3 billion cubic feet of gas. As of 2018, new drilling in the Fayetteville Shale had ceased and almost 1/5 of wells were abandoned.

Paleontology

Flora
Because the Fayetteville Formation is a marine unit, most of the plants found in the black shales must have been washed into the Carboniferous sea from a landmass. However one unit within the formation, the Weddington Sandstone Member, is a series of river deposited sand beds. Fossil plants from this unit were probably deposited closer to their source.

Adiantites
A. minima
Ankyropteris
Archaeocalamites
A. fayettevillensis
A. gracilentus
A. umbralis
A. wedingtonensis
Bothrodendron
Carpolithus
C. inquirenda
Cardiopteris
C. hirta
Chlamidostachys
C. chesterianus
Lepidocystis
L. chesterensis
Lepidodendron 
L. henbesti
L. occidentale
L. purduei
L. wedingtonense
Lepidophloios 
Lepidophyllum
L. sagittatum
Lepidostrobus
L. occidentalis
Lepidostrous 
Lyginopteris
L. royalii
Medullosa 
Neuropteris
Pachytesta 
Rhacopteris
Rhynchogonium 
R. fayettevillense
Rhynochosperma
R. quinnii 
Sphenopteris
S. (Palmatopteris) erectiloba
S. (Calymmatotheca) mississippiana
Stigmaria
S. arkansana
S. wedingtonensis
Tivena
T. arkansana

Fauna

Vertebrates
Carcharopsis wortheni
"Cobelodus"  
Ozarcus mapesae

Echinoderms

Acrocrinus constrictus
Agassizocrinus conicus
Alcimocrinus ornatus
Allocatillocrinus carpenteri
Ampelocrinus erectus
Aphelecrinus exoticus
A. planus
Childonocrinus trinodus
Cymbiocrinus gravis
Dasciocrinus aulicus
Heliosocrinus aftonensis
Intermediacrinus modernus
Linocrinus
Mantikosocrinus castus
Onchyocrinus
Onychocrinus pulaskiensis
Ophiurocrinus hebdenensis
Pentremites platybasis
P. pulchellus
Phacelocrinus
Phanocrinus 
P. alexanderi
P. cylindricus
P. formosus
Scytalocrinus aftonensis
Taxocrinus cestriensis 
T. whitefieldi.
Ulrichicrinus chesterensis

Cephalopods

Arcanoceras furnishi 
Cluthoceras glicki 
Cluthoceras pisiforme 
Cravenoceras fayettevillae 
Cravenoceras lineolatum 
Dombarites mapesi 
Eurmorphoceras plummeri 
Fayettevillea planorbis 
Girtyoceras 
Goniatites granosus 
Lusitanites subcircularis 
Metadimorphoceras wiswellense 
Neoglyphioceras crebriliratum 
Paracravenoceras ozarkense 
Paradimorphoceras 
Pronorites baconi 
Rayonnoceras solidiforme 
Tumulites varians

Corals
Amplexus expansus 
Michelinia meekana 
Palaecris carinata

Bivalves

Aviculopecten squamula 
Aviculopecten jennyi 
Aviculopecten multilineatus 
Aviculopecten morrowensis 
Aviculopecten inspeciosus 
Canyella peculiaris 
Cardiomorpha inflata 
Conocardium peculiare 
Cypricardia fayettevillensis 
Cyprecardella sublata 
Edmondia equilateralis 
Palaeoneilo sera 
Phestia stevensiana <ref name = pojeta/
Sanguinolites simulans 
Solenamorpha nitida 
Sphenotus branneri 
Sphenotus washingtonensis 
Sphenotus dubius 
Sphenotus meslerianus

Brachiopods
Adairia adairensis
Inflatia gracilis
Inflatia cherokeensis
Inflatia pusilla
Inflatia inflata
Orthotetes protensus
Orthotetes subglobosus

Gastropods

Euconospira disjuncta 
Mourlonia lativittata 
Patellilabia laevigata 
Platyceras subelegans 
Platyceras compressum 
Sinuitina venata 
Trepospira discus

Arthropods

Amphissites
Bairdia
Cyrtoproetus kerhini
Kirkbya 
Geisina
Glyptopleura
Graphiadactyllis
Orthobairdia
Paladin murconatus 
Paraparchites
Roundyella
Sansabella
Serenida

Ostracods
Cavellina
Kegelites
Sargentina

Bryozoans

Archimedes communis
Archimedes compactus
Archimedes confertus
Archimedes distans
Archimedes inflatus
Archimedes intermedius
Archimedes invaginatus
Archimedes meekanus
Archimedes owenanus
Archimedes proutanus
Archimedes sublaxus
Archimedes terebriformis
Batostomella parvula
Fenestella cestriensis
Fenestella compress
Fenestella elevatipora
Fenestella serratula
Fenestella tenax

Leioclema
Polypora cestriensis
Polypora corticosa
Polypora spinulifera
Rhombopora tabulata
Septopora cestriensis
Streblotrypa nicklesi
Streblotrypa subspinosa
Sulcoretepora americana
Sulcoretepora labiosa
Sulcoretepora nitida
Thamniscus turcillatus

Foraminifera
Earlandia
Eosigmoilina rugosa

Trace Fossils 
Cruziana
Planolites
Teichichnus

References

Geologic formations of Arkansas
Carboniferous Arkansas
Mississippian United States
Serpukhovian
Shale formations of the United States
Oil-bearing shales in the United States
Natural gas fields in the United States
Carboniferous System of North America
Carboniferous southern paleotropical deposits